"Awesome God" is a contemporary worship song written by Rich Mullins and first recorded on his 1988 album, Winds of Heaven, Stuff of Earth. It was the first single from the album and rose to the number one spot on Christian radio and subsequently became a popular congregational song. Its title is inspired by a biblical expression (Nehemiah 1:5, Nehemiah 9:32, Psalm 47, Daniel 9:4, etc.), variously translated as "Awesome God", (JPS, in the old-fashioned meaning "awe-inspiring"), "great" (KJV), among other alternatives. Due to the popularity of the song, it became Mullins' signature song.

Commentary 
Mullins did not consider the song to be one of his best. In an interview with The Lighthouse Electronic Magazine in April 1996, he said:
You know, the thing I like about Awesome God is that it's one of the worst-written songs that I ever wrote; it's just poorly crafted. But the thing is that sometimes, I think, that when you become too conscientious about being a songwriter, the message becomes a vehicle for the medium. This is a temptation that I think all songwriters have. I think a great songwriter is someone who is able to take a very meaningful piece of wisdom - or of folly or whatever - and say it in a way that is most likely to make people respond. But, what you want them to respond to is not how cleverly you did that; what you want them to respond to is your message.

Cover versions 

Over a year after Mullins' death (in September 1997) the song was covered on a tribute album for Mullins entitled Awesome God: A Tribute to Rich Mullins by Contemporary Christian musician, Michael W. Smith. Numerous other Christian artists have performed versions in numerous styles, from ska to swing to rock and traditional worship style, even hardcore punk and heavy metal by the bands Unashamed and Pantokrator.

Congregational and other use 
The song may be used as a hymn and can be sung using only the chorus, alone or in medley.

References

External links 
 Awesome God lyrics

Contemporary Christian songs
1988 songs
Songs written by Rich Mullins